Joseph-Fernand Fafard (25 August 1882 – 14 May 1955) was a Laurier Liberal then a Liberal party member of the House of Commons of Canada. He was born in L'Islet, Quebec and became a land surveyor.

Fafard attended L'Islet College and :fr:Collège de Lévis. In 1901, he surveyed land in Alberta and Saskatchewan for his probationary course and in 1905 earned his diploma. He was the first to conduct a land survey of the Abitibi region and also became vice-president of the Quebec Land Surveyors Association.

He was first elected to Parliament under the Laurier Liberals party banner at the L'Islet riding in the 1917 general election and re-elected under the Liberal Party there in 1921, 1925, 1926 and 1930. With riding boundary changes, Fafard was re-elected for the Liberals in 1935 at the Montmagny—L'Islet riding.

In 1940, after completing his term in the 18th Canadian Parliament, Fafard was appointed to the Senate for the De la Durantaye, Quebec division and continued in that role until his death on 14 May 1955 in Quebec City following an unidentified brief illness.

References

External links
 
 

1882 births
1955 deaths
Canadian senators from Quebec
Canadian surveyors
Laurier Liberals
Liberal Party of Canada MPs
Liberal Party of Canada senators
Members of the House of Commons of Canada from Quebec
People from Chaudière-Appalaches